The 31st Punjabis was an infantry regiment of the British Indian Army. It was raised in 1857, as Van Cortlandt's Levy. The regiment was designated as the 31st Punjabis in 1903 and became 2nd Battalion 16th Punjab Regiment in 1922. In 1947, it was allocated to the Pakistan Army, where it continues to exist as 14th Battalion The Punjab Regiment.

Early history
The regiment was raised during the upheaval of the Indian Mutiny, by General Van Cortlandt at Ferozepur on 22 May 1857, as Van Cortlandt's Levy. Their class composition was Punjabi Muslims, Sikhs, Dogras, Hill Rajputs and Gurkhas. The regiment took part in the Bhutan War of 1864-66, the Second Afghan War of 1878-80, and  the Siege of Malakand in 1895-97. At Malakand, Sir Winston Churchill, who was covering the campaign as a war correspondent for The Daily Telegraph, was temporarily attached with the regiment. The future Prime Minister of Great Britain cut an impressive figure on his grey charger, being in the thick of action everywhere. He, however, was disappointed when he was not allowed to take over the command of the regiment!.

31st Punjabis
Subsequent to the reforms brought about in the Indian Army by Lord Kitchener in 1903, the regiment's designation was changed to 31st Punjabis.
During the First World War, the 31st Punjabis served in Mesopotamia and Salonika in Greece. It then served at Constantinople, Turkey as part of Allied occupation forces.

Subsequent history
In 1921–22, a major reorganization was undertaken in the British Indian Army, leading to the formation of large infantry groups of four to six battalions. Among these was the 16th Punjab Regiment, formed by grouping the 31st Punjabis  with the 30th, 33rd and 46th Punjabis, and the 9th Bhopal Infantry. The battalion's new designation was 2nd Battalion 16th Punjab Regiment. During the Second World War, the battalion fought in the Malayan Campaign and was taken prisoner by the Japanese on Singapore Island following the British surrender on 15 February 1942. It was re-raised in 1946. In 1947, the 16th Punjab Regiment was allocated to Pakistan Army. In 1956, it was merged with the 1st, 14th and 15th Punjab Regiments to form one large Punjab Regiment, and 2/16th Punjab was redesignated as 14 Punjab. In 1948, the battalion participated in the war with India in Kashmir, while in 1965, it fought in the Chhamb-Jaurian and Sialkot Sectors. During the Indo-Pakistan War of 1971, 14 Punjab fought in the Battle of Chhamb in Kashmir.

Genealogy

1857 Van Cortlandt's Levy
1857 Bloomfield's Sikhs
1857 23rd Regiment of Punjab Infantry
1861 35th Regiment of Bengal Native Infantry
1861 31st Regiment of Bengal Native Infantry
1864 31st (Punjab) Regiment of Bengal Native Infantry
1885 31st (Punjab) Regiment of Bengal Infantry
1901 31st Punjab Infantry
1903 31st Punjabis
1922 2nd Battalion 16th Punjab Regiment
1956 14th Battalion The Punjab Regiment

See also 
 16th Punjab Regiment

References

Further reading
Lawford, Lt Col JP, and Catto, Maj WE. (1967). Solah Punjab: The History of the 16th Punjab Regiment. Aldershot: Gale & Polden.
Qureshi, Col HU. (1985). History of DoSolah: 14th Battalion The Punjab Regiment 1857-1985. Published by the battalion.
Rizvi, Brig SHA. (1984). Veteran Campaigners – A History of the Punjab Regiment 1759-1981. Lahore: Wajidalis.
Cardew, Lt FG. (1903). A Sketch of the Services of the Bengal Native Army to the Year 1895. Calcutta: Military Department.

Punjab Regiment (Pakistan)
British Indian Army infantry regiments
Indian World War I regiments
Military units and formations established in 1857
1857 establishments in India